Helios Airways  (Ajet.com) was a low-cost Cypriot airline operating scheduled and charter flights between Cyprus and many European and African destinations. It had its corporate headquarters on the grounds of Larnaca International Airport in Larnaca. Its main base was Larnaca International Airport. Flights ceased on 6 November 2006 because the company's aircraft were detained and its bank accounts frozen by the government of Cyprus.

History
Helios Airways was established on 23 September 1998, formed by the owners of TEA (Cyprus), a Cypriot offshore air operator specialising in Boeing 737 wet leases worldwide, and was the first independent, privately owned airline in Cyprus. On 15 May 2000, it operated its first charter flight to London Gatwick Airport. Originally, it offered charter services and scheduled services to destinations including Athens, London, Manchester, Amsterdam, Edinburgh, Prague, Sofia, Bournemouth, Cairo, Paris, Dublin and Warsaw. Helios Airways was acquired in 2004 by the Libra Holidays Group, of Limassol, Cyprus.

On 14 August 2005, Helios Airways Flight 522 crashed near Grammatiko, Greece, after the crew was incapacitated due to lack of oxygen. All 121 passengers and crew were killed. The investigation concluded that both maintenance crews and the pilots had failed to ensure the pressurization system was set to "automatic", and as a result, the plane never pressurized. The accident revealed many problems with safety of the airline and led to manslaughter charges against five airline officials.

On 14 March 2006, it was announced that Helios Airways would be rebranded as Ajet and would withdraw from scheduled operations. On 30 October 2006, responding to rumors, Ajet announced that it was to cease operations over the period of the following 90 days. In light of that, the Cyprus Government demanded that back taxes be paid immediately. Also, private suppliers demanded that they be paid in cash for any further goods and services provided to the company. On 31 October 2006, the airline announced that it was ceasing operations immediately. On 11 November 2006, the company website announced that the government of the Republic of Cyprus had "illegally detained Ajet’s aircraft and frozen the Company’s bank accounts", which was in "direct contravention to the successful appeal lodged by Ajet in the District Court, causing substantial financial damage to the Company". As a result, Ajet announced that all flights scheduled to be operated by other carriers to all destinations would no longer be operating, as of Monday, 6 November 2006, and that passengers would therefore have to make their own arrangements.

All Ajet flights were suspended from 1 November 2006, and the majority of its schedules were taken over by the charter carrier XL Airways UK (which itself went out of business in September 2008). According to the owners, Libra Holidays, the decision to cease operations was due to poor financial results and pressure from creditors.

Fleet

When the airline ceased operating, the jet fleet consisted of the following aircraft:

3 × Boeing 737-800

Aircraft operated
The airline had also operated the following aircraft:
1 × Airbus A319-112 (2005), leased from Lotus Air
1 × Airbus A320-211 (2005), leased from MenaJet
1 × Boeing 737-300 (2004-2005), involved in the accident
1 × Boeing 737-400 (2000-2001)

Incidents and accidents
On 14 August 2005, Helios Airways Flight 522, a Boeing 737-300 flying from Larnaca to Prague via Athens crashed near Grammatiko, Greece. The flight crew had become incapacitated shortly after take-off from Larnaca owing to a loss of cabin pressure. The autopilot entered a holding pattern over Athens and the aircraft began to descend after the fuel was exhausted, crashing into hilly terrain about 40 km north of Athens International Airport. All 121 passengers and crew were killed in the accident.

References

External links

 Former Helios site
 Helios Airways (Archive)

Airlines established in 1998
1998 establishments in Cyprus
Airlines disestablished in 2006
2006 disestablishments in Greece
Defunct airlines of Cyprus
Larnaca